687 Tinette is a minor planet orbiting the Sun. It was discovered by Austrian astronomer Johann Palisa on 16 August 1909 from Vienna and was given the preliminary designation 1909 HG.

Photometric observations at the Palmer Divide Observatory in Colorado Springs, Colorado, in 1999 were used to build a light curve for this object. The asteroid displayed a rotation period of 7.40 ± 0.02 hours and a brightness variation of 0.25 ± 0.01 in magnitude.

References

External links 
 Lightcurve plot of 687 Tinette, Palmer Divide Observatory, B. D. Warner (1999)
 Asteroid Lightcurve Database (LCDB), query form (info )
 Dictionary of Minor Planet Names, Google books
 Asteroids and comets rotation curves, CdR – Observatoire de Genève, Raoul Behrend
 Discovery Circumstances: Numbered Minor Planets (1)-(5000) – Minor Planet Center
 
 

Background asteroids
Tinette
Tinette
X-type asteroids (Tholen)
X-type asteroids (SMASS)
19090816